Joe Neil Beeler (1931–2006) was an American illustrator, artist and sculptor specializing in the field of Western art. In 1965, he cofounded the Cowboy Artists of America (CAA) with Charlie Dye, John Hampton and George Phippen.

Personal information
Beeler was born part Cherokee on December 25, 1931, in Joplin, Missouri to Jack Beeler and Lean Setser. At an early age, Beeler started drawing and continued throughout college at Kansas State Teachers College and later attended the Art Center of Design in Los Angeles, California. After his time in school, Beeler worked as an illustrator for the University of Oklahoma Press. Beeler's career progressed after his one-man performance at the Gilcrease Museum. In 1962, he and his family moved to Sedona, Arizona, where he died. In 1965, Beeler along with many other cowboy artists started the Cowboy Artists of America.

Appearances
His works have been displayed in a number of museums including:
 Woolaroc Museum
 National Cowboy Hall of Fame
 Montana Historical Society
 Charles M. Russell Museum
 Heard Museum
 Whitney Museum of American Art
 Institute of Texan Cultures

Death
Joe Beeler died Wednesday April 26, 2006. He was helping neighbors and friends rope and brand calves when he succumbed to a heart attack. Joe was 74 years old.

References

Sources and external links 
 Joe Beeler on AskART
 CAA Museum – biography
 Joe Beeler obituary
 Joe Beeler's art 
 The Joe Beeler Collection at Pittsburg State University

1931 births
2006 deaths
People from Joplin, Missouri
People from Norman, Oklahoma
American illustrators
Artists of the American West
Artists from Arizona
People from Sedona, Arizona
Native American artists